A longhunter (or long hunter) was an 18th-century explorer and hunter who made expeditions into the American frontier for as much as six months at a time. Historian Emory Hamilton says that "The Long Hunter was peculiar to Southwest Virginia only, and nowhere else on any frontier did such hunts ever originate."

The term, however, has been used loosely to describe any unofficial European American explorer of the period. Most long hunts started in the Holston River Valley near Chilhowie, Virginia. The hunters came from there and the adjacent Clinch River Valley, where they were land owners or residents. The parties of two or three men (and rarely more) usually started their hunts in October and ended toward the end of March or early in April, going west into the territory of present-day Kentucky and Tennessee. This was part of the homeland of the Cherokee people.

The longhunters gathered information about the lands in the 1760s and 1770s that would prove critical to early European American settlement in Tennessee and Kentucky. Many longhunters were employed by land surveyors seeking to claim new lands ceded to the British by the French in the Ohio River Valley following the latter's defeat in the Seven Years' War. Some later helped guide settlers to what became Middle Tennessee and southeastern Kentucky.

In Tennessee history

As colonial settlement approached the eastern base of the Appalachian Mountains in the early 18th century, game in the Piedmont region became more scarce. Merchants returning from trade missions to Overhill Cherokee villages in the Tennessee Valley brought back news of the abundance of game west of the range, and began taking hunters along on their trade expeditions. In 1748 and 1750, Thomas Walker crossed the mountains and explored the Holston River valley, recording and widely publicizing the location of Cumberland Gap— a pass near the modern border of Virginia, Kentucky, and Tennessee. This allowed relatively easy access to the headwaters of the Tennessee and Cumberland rivers, by which travelers could enter the territories downriver.

In 1761, Elisha Wallen (spelled variously "Walden", "Wallin", and "Walling") led the first major recorded long hunt into what is now Tennessee. Wallen set up a station camp in Lee County, Virginia, and trekked into the Clinch and Powell valleys in what is now Hawkins County, Tennessee.  That same year, Colonel Adam Stephen led a regiment of Virginia soldiers and militia to Long Island of the Holston, in what is now Sullivan County, Tennessee.  The expedition, which was launched in retaliation for the Cherokee sacking of Fort Loudoun in 1760, forced the Cherokee to sign a peace treaty.

With the end of the Seven Years' War in 1763, the French ceded their claims to lands east of the Mississippi River to Great Britain. After the Anglo-Cherokee War, longhunters (some of whom may have been veterans of Stephen's expedition) began crossing the Appalachians into Tennessee and Kentucky in greater numbers.  In 1764, Daniel Boone, Richard Callaway and Benjamin Cutbirth explored the upper Holston Valley as agents for Richard Henderson, a land speculator who later played an important role in the early settlement of Tennessee.  One of their camps later was used by Boone's friend William Bean, Tennessee's first known permanent Euro-American settler.  He built a cabin at the site around 1769.

In 1763, King George III issued a royal proclamation prohibiting colonists from the acquisition of pelts from Cherokee lands without a trading license; this effectively barred hunting west of the Appalachian range. Both the Cherokee and the British, however, had considerable difficulty enforcing this ban. In 1769, Cherokee Chief Oconastota complained to the British Superintendent of Indian Affairs that the entire Cherokee Nation was "filling with Hunters, and the guns rattling every way on the path." While some longhunters had their pelts confiscated by the Cherokee, and a rare few were even killed, most managed to avoid detection.

In 1766 James Smith led an ambitious long hunt into Middle, West Tennessee, and Kentucky, following the Cumberland River all the way to its mouth on the Ohio River (in present-day, Kentucky).  While a member of this expedition, Uriah Stone, was hunting along a tributary of the Cumberland a colonial French hunting companion stole all his furs.  The tributary was subsequently named Stones River.  Stone returned to the Cumberland valley in 1769, along with fellow hunters Kasper Mansker, Isaac and Abraham Bledsoe, Joseph Drake, and Robert Crockett. Although Crockett was killed that year, the 1766 and 1769 expeditions identified various trails, salt licks, and camping areas that later helped guide the first Anglo-American settlers to the Middle Tennessee area.

Legacy
Various geographical entities in Tennessee are named for longhunters. Walden Ridge, the eastern escarpment of the Cumberland Plateau in Tennessee, is named for Elisha Wallen, one of the first Anglo-Americans to observe it.  A high school and dozens of geographical features in Tennessee have been named for Daniel Boone, whose exploits came to symbolize frontier life in Tennessee and Kentucky.  Isaac Bledsoe was the namesake of Bledsoe Creek in Sumner County, Tennessee, now the site of Bledsoe Creek State Park. Isaac's brother, Anthony, later became the namesake for Bledsoe County.

In 1780, Kasper Mansker built a frontier station in what is now Goodlettsville, just north of Nashville. In 1986, the city of Goodlettsville built a replica of Mansker's Station (it is based on historic examples, as the fort's original layout is unknown). It is now open to the public. In the 1970s, the state of Tennessee established Long Hunter State Park along the J. Percy Priest Lake impoundment of Stones River, in the area where Uriah Stone had his furs stolen more than 200 years earlier.

In Kentucky history

The end of King George's War in 1748 left control of the territory between the Appalachian Mountains and the Mississippi River in dispute.  The French wanted the region to connect their holdings in Canada with Illinois Country and New Orleans, and the British sought to establish a foothold in the Ohio Valley.  French commander Pierre-Joseph Celoron de Blainville conducted maneuvers in 1749 that discouraged British trade west of the Appalachians, although American colonial land speculators remained interested in the region.  Walker's 1750 expedition briefly explored what is now southeastern Kentucky, and explorer Christopher Gist managed to reach the mouth of the Kentucky River in 1751.  In the opening years of the French and Indian War, the French gained control of the Ohio Valley with the defeat of George Washington at Fort Necessity in 1754.  With the fall of Fort Duquesne and the construction of Fort Pitt in 1758, however, the French were forced to evacuate the region.  The French departure and a relative state of peace with the Cherokee during the same period opened up the region to explorers and hunters from the Thirteen Colonies.

John and Samuel Pringle, two deserters from Fort Pitt, spent much of the early 1760s hunting in the Tygart Valley and likely ranged into what is now Kentucky.  Part of Elisha Walden's 1761 party hunted along the Rockcastle River from their station camp in southwestern Virginia.  In 1767, an expedition led by James Harrod and Michael Holsteiner (Michael Stoner) crossed Kentucky from north-to-south, reaching the Nashville area several weeks after departing from the Illinois Country.  Around the same time, an expedition led by Benjamin Cutbirth crossed Cumberland Gap and pushed all the way to the Mississippi River, where they shipped the pelts they had collected down to New Orleans.

In 1768, an American explorer named John Finley passed through the Yadkin Valley and visited Daniel Boone, with whom he had served in the French and Indian War.  Finley told Boone of the natural splendor of Kentucky's Bluegrass region, which he had visited as a merchant before the French and Indian War.  The following year, the two led an expedition into Kentucky, traveling up the Rockcastle River and establishing a station camp at Red Lick Fork. While Boone and a companion named John Stuart were hunting along the Kentucky River, they were captured by the Shawnee, and their pelts were confiscated.  They returned to their station camp to find it plundered, and learned that Finley and the rest of the expedition had returned to North Carolina.  Undeterred, Boone and Stuart continued hunting in the region.  Boone was later joined by his brother, Squire, and the Boone brothers remained in the Kentucky wilderness until 1771.  Although they again had their pelts confiscated when they were intercepted by the Cherokee at Cumberland Gap, the Boones were nevertheless eager to return to settle in the region.  Daniel Boone's vivid accounts of his hunting exploits helped draw a flood of settlers to Kentucky in subsequent years.

Legacy
Numerous natural and political entities in Kentucky bear the names of longhunters, including Boone County and Boonesborough, named for Daniel Boone, and Harrodsburg, named for James Harrod.  Kenton County is named for Simon Kenton, who, believing he was a fugitive, spent the mid-1770s hunting in eastern Kentucky.  Longhunter James Knox named the Dix River after Cherokee leader Captain Dick, who gave Knox permission to hunt along the river in 1770.  The U.S. government established Daniel Boone National Forest in 1937 in the eastern part of the state.

Notable longhunters
 Isaac Bledsoe
 Daniel Boone
 Squire Boone
 Richard Callaway
 Samuel Dale
 John Duff
 James Harrod
 Simon Kenton
 Kasper Mansker
 Henry Skaggs
 James Smith
 Edward Worthington

References

Further reading

 "The Long Hunter" Emory L. Hamilton, The Mountain Empire Genealogical Quarterly, danielboonetrail.com
 William Blevins, Long Hunter

External links
 Remember The Longhunters
 Museum of the Fur Trade
 Longhunter Society - National Muzzle Loading Rifle Association

Pre-statehood history of Virginia
Pre-statehood history of Tennessee
Pre-statehood history of Kentucky
American hunters